Pillar Provincial Park is a provincial park in British Columbia, Canada. The park area is 2.34 hectares and protects a stone pillar (sometimes called a hoodoo) on the hillside above Pillar Lake.

External links

Provincial parks of British Columbia
2004 establishments in British Columbia
Protected areas established in 2004